Adventures of the Flying Cadets is a 13-episode 1943 Universal film serial directed by Ray Taylor and 
Lewis D. Collins.

Plot
Flying students Danny Collins (Johnny Downs), "Jinx" Roberts (Bobby Jordan), "Scrapper" McKay (Ward Wood) and "Zombie" Parker (William Benedict) are suspected of a series of murders perpetrated by engineer, Arthur Galt (Robert Armstrong) operating as a Nazi agent known as the Black Hangman. He has disposed of several people who accompanied him on an expedition which located lost helium deposits in Africa.

Galt has also imprisoned the remaining members of the expedition, Professor Mason (Selmer Jackson) and his daughter Andre (Jennifer Holt). Galt plans to sell the helium to Germany through a Gestapo ring headed by Kurt von Heiger (Eduardo Ciannelli). The four students, believing Galt to be an ally, fly with him to Africa as they hope to track down Von Heiger, thinking he is the Black Hangman, and clear their own names on the charges of murder. The four are pursued to Africa by U.S. Army Intelligence officer Captain Ralph Carson (Regis Toomey).

The boys survive a tailspin and upon landing, take Galt into custody but momentarily he convinces authorities that he is innocent. When he tries to contact other Nazi agents, he is revealed to be their ring leader. The cadets are vindicated and receive Air Force Wings as they prepare to join Allied pilots going off to war.

Chapter titles
 The Black Hangman Strikes
 Menaced by Murderers
 Into the Flames
 The Door to Death
 Crashed in a Crater
 Rendezvous with Doom
 Gestapo Execution
 Masters of Treachery
 Wings of Destruction
 Caught in the Caves of An-Kar-Ban
 Hostages for Treason
 The Black Hangman Strikes Again
 The Toll of Treason
Source:

Cast

 Johnny Downs as Cadet Danny Collins
 Bobby Jordan as Cadet "Jinx" Roberts
 Ward Wood as Cadet "Scrapper" McKay
 William Benedict as Cadet "Zombie" Parker
 Jennifer Holt as Andre Mason
 Eduardo Ciannelli as Kurt von Heiger, alias Corby
 Regis Toomey as Captain Ralph Carson
 Robert Armstrong as Arthur Galt/The Black Hangman

 Charles Trowbridge as Maj. William Elliott
 Joseph Crehan as Colonel George Bolton
 Addison Richards as A.J. "Jack" Hill
 Leyland Hodgson as Captain Hartley, British Army
 Ian Keith as Colonel Lee
 Philip Van Zandt as Herman Klott/Jack Hargrove
 Joan Blair as Frau Klott/Mrs. Hargrove
 Selmer Jackson as Professor Mason

Production
Adventures of the Flying Cadets was Universal's last aviation serial. The first had been The Airmail Mystery in 1932.

References
Notes

Bibliography

 Cline, William C. "3. The Six Faces of Adventure". In the Nick of Time. Jefferson, North Carolina: McFarland & Company, Inc., 1984. .
 Cline, William C. "Filmography", In the Nick of Time. Jefferson, North Carolina: McFarland & Company, Inc., 1984. .
 Farmer, James H. Celluloid Wings: The Impact of Movies on Aviation. Blue Ridge Summit, Pennsylvania: Tab Books Inc., 1984. .
 Weiss, Ken and Ed Goodgold. To be Continued ...: A Complete Guide to Motion Picture Serials. New York: Bonanza Books, 1973. .

External links
 
 

1943 films
1943 adventure films
American aviation films
World War II aviation films
American black-and-white films
1940s English-language films
Universal Pictures film serials
Films directed by Ray Taylor
Films directed by Lewis D. Collins
Films about the United States Army Air Forces
American adventure films
Films with screenplays by George H. Plympton
1940s American films